Play is a 2005 Chilean film directed by Alicia Scherson. It was selected as the Chilean entry for the Best Foreign Language Oscar at the 78th Academy Awards, but it did not make the final shortlist.

Plot 
This movie shows the events that happen to Cristina, a young Mapuche woman who works as a caretaker for an elderly man in Santiago, Chile, where she lives. One day, she runs into Tristán, a close friend who has just lost a suitcase and is in a state of shock. The movie begins with a proverb that says, "They were hard times, but modern."

Cast
 Viviana Herrera 
 Andrés Ulloa 
 Aline Kuppenhein 
 Coca Guazzini 
 Jorge Alis 
 Francisco Copello 
 Juan Pablo Quezada 
 Andrei Slobodianik 
 María José San Martín

See also 
List of submissions to the 78th Academy Awards for Best Foreign Language Film
List of Chilean submissions for the Academy Award for Best Foreign Language Film

References

External links

 Cinema of Chile

2005 drama films
2005 films
Chilean drama films